Harold Verdun Baigent  (16 November 1916 – 9 March 1996), known as 'Baige', was a New Zealand theatre director, actor and arts manager. He trained as an actor in the USA at Yale University Drama School, and acted in Broadway and London stage productions, before returning to New Zealand in the late 1940s, where he founded his own drama company and worked as a drama tutor and stage manager. In the 1960s he settled in Melbourne, Australia. As director of the Emerald Hill Theatre Company and the Victorian Travelling Theatre, he was an influential figure in the Victorian theatrical scene, and played a significant role in promoting the arts in regional Victoria and South Australia. He was associated with the Warrandyte Arts Association Drama Group and performed in many productions including Twelfth Night (1964) as Malvolio, and as director of Salad Days (1968).

As an actor, Baigent was known for many parts on Australian film and television, including roles in the film Gallipoli and the television series The Flying Doctors, and a memorable introductory monologue at the beginning of the film Mad Max 2. He was director of the Council of Adult Education in Adelaide, South Australia for many years, and founded the Arts Train, an innovative travelling arts project that toured small towns throughout South Australia and Victoria. He retired to the Heathcote area in the 1980s, but continued to be actively involved in theatre and the arts there until his death in 1996.

Partial filmography
Mad Dog Morgan (1976) - Extra #1
Jacka V.C. (1978) - Himself
Gallipoli (1981) - Camel Driver
Mad Max 2 (1981) - Narrator (voice)
Double Deal (1983) - Sir Henry
Niel Lynne (1985) - Guard
Slate, Wyn & Me (1987) - Sammy
Golden Braid (1990) - Clockmaker
Garbo (1992) - Old Resident with Cat

References

External links
 

1916 births
1996 deaths
New Zealand male film actors
20th-century New Zealand male actors
New Zealand directors
New Zealand expatriates in the United States
New Zealand expatriates in the United Kingdom
New Zealand emigrants to Australia